Keshavram Kashiram Bambhaniya also known as k.k.shastri born on 28 July 1905 at Mangarol in Junagadh district, Bombay Presidency. He was the founding leader of the Vishwa Hindu Parishad. He was among the dignitaries who attended the first meeting of VHP in 1964 and since then continuously associated with the VHP work and was head of the Gujarat unit also.

Biography
K. K. Shastri completed matriculation from Mumbai University in 1922. Later he studied poetry, Sanskrit language and grammar. He did his Diploma in Literature from Saurashtra University. He started his career in teaching as an assistant teacher of Sanskrit at Coronation High School in 1925 in Mangrol (District: Junagadh - Gujarat)& Left it because of Muslim Management. Later he joined Sanskrit Pathshala as a part-time teacher. He became assistant editor of Prajabandhu (Gujarati weekly) in Ahmedabad in 1936. He worked with Gujarat Vernacular Society and Gujarat Assembly in 1937. He joined L.D. Institute of Learning and Research in 1958. He also worked as an honorary lecturer of Gujarati at the B.J. Institute of Learning and Research. He was an associate professor of Sanskrit and Gujarati at the B.D. Women's College. He joined the Gujarat Research Society in 1961 as the honorary Regulator.He also was a "KULPATI" of Bharatiya Sanskar Dham. He was a mentor to the current Prime Minister of India- Narendra Modi.

Achievements

He guided more than 19 researchers in completing their Ph. D degrees and more than 1500 other graduate students in Gujarati literature. He was regarded as a mobile dictionary of Gujarati language, grammar as well as Vedic literature. A guide and patron to innumerable students, followers and VHP workers, Shastriji himself was an institution. Besides 240 books to his credit, he has written over 1500 research papers in Gujarati, Sanskrit, Hindi and English.

He was conferred Padma Shri decades back recognizing his talent and outstanding services to the Gujarati literature. He won gold medals  from Gujarat Sahitya Sabha, Gujarat Itihas Parishad and Nadiyad Pushtmargiya Library and bronze medal from Gujarat Research Society.

Death
He died September 9, 2006 in Ahmedabad at the age of 101.

Books
Shastri's prominent publications are as under,
 Brihad Gujarati Kosh (part I&II)
 Vanaushadhi Kosh (which is translated in 10 languages)
 Jaisamhita (an 8800 episode book on Mahabharat)
 Bharatsamhita
 Shrimadbhagwat Puran (Sanskrit).
 Gujarati Vagvikas
 Vagvaibhav
 Bhalan - ek adhyayan
 Kavi rachit part 1 & 2
 Apbhransh vyakaran
 Narsinh mehta - ek adhyayan
 Pramanand - ek adhyayan
 Akshar ane Shabda (base of gujaratee vyakaran)
 Aakshvanee ane bija lekho

References

Hindutva
Indian centenarians
Men centenarians
1905 births
2006 deaths
Vishva Hindu Parishad members
Recipients of the Padma Shri in literature & education
People from Junagadh district
Writers from Gujarat
20th-century Indian writers
20th-century Indian educators
Educators from Gujarat
Recipients of the Ranjitram Suvarna Chandrak